The Vanilla UAV is a long-endurance long-endurance, low-cost UAV produced by American manufacturer Vanilla Unmanned.

Development 

Having cost $3 million to develop, its production cost would be $500,000 while it is comparable to the 24h-endurance Boeing Insitu ScanEagle.

In October 2017, it completed a five-day 1 h 20 min flight at NASA Wallops in Virginia, covering 7,000 miles (11,265 km) and landing with three days of fuel remaining.

Vanilla seeks to raise $5 million as a larger design could carry a 250 lb (113 kg) payload.

Founded by aerostructures designer Daniel Hatfield, systems engineer Neil Boertlein and programme manager Jeremy Novara, Vanilla Aircraft had an annual budget of $300,000 from NASA and the US Department of Defense.
In October 2020, Vanilla Unmanned was acquired by Platform Aerospace, a provider of aircraft prototyping, modification, and systems integration.

On 2 October 2021, a Vanilla UAV completed an eight-day and 50 minute flight from Edwards AFB in California, flying 10,600 nmi (19,600 km) in circuits; an internal combustion engine-powered UAV record to be ratified by the FAI. In November 2021, NASA flew the UAV in the Arctic from Deadhorse Airport, Alaska, to test instruments to survey the region, monitoring sea level change, as it could fly for nearly five days over sea ice, Greenland and Antarctica ice sheets: a radar to measure the depth of snow, ice-detecting sensors, heating systems, and a special anti-icing coating.

Design 

The initial VA001 is powered by an off-the-shelf diesel engine driving a pusher propeller, it is controlled by a Piccolo autopilot.

Weighting up to 600 lb (272 kg), it has a 36 ft (11 m) wing and a 55-gallon (208-litre) fuel capacity.

It can carry a 30 lb (13.6 kg) payload: electro-optical and SAR sensors for surveillance including maritime, or act as a radio relay.

For the updated Vanilla UAV, VA001's maximum takeoff weight was increased by 75 lb (34 kg); it was 200 lb (90 kg) lighter at landing, and it can carry a 150 lb (68 kg) payload over 15,000 nmi (27,780 km).

Specifications (VA001)

References

External links

Unmanned aerial vehicles of the United States
Unmanned aerial vehicles